Bakhtiyar Baiseitov may refer to:
 Bakhtiyar Baiseitov (footballer) (born 1952), Kazakh football manager
 Bakhtiyar Baiseitov (wrestler) (born 1971), Kazakh Greco-Roman wrestler